Aglaoschema is a genus of beetles in the family Cerambycidae, containing the following species:

 Aglaoschema acauna (Napp, 2008)
 Aglaoschema albicorne (Fabricius, 1801)
 Aglaoschema apixara (Napp, 2007)
 Aglaoschema basale (Melzer, 1933)
 Aglaoschema camusi (Dalens, Tavakilian, & Touroult, 2010)
 Aglaoschema collorata (Napp, 1993)
 Aglaoschema concolor (Gounelle, 1911)
 Aglaoschema cyaneum (Pascoe, 1860)
 Aglaoschema dulce (Napp & Martins, 1988)
 Aglaoschema erythrocephala (Napp & Martins, 1988)
 Aglaoschema geoffroyi (Dalens, Tavakilian, & Touroult, 2010)
 Aglaoschema haemorrhoidale (Germar, 1824)
 Aglaoschema inca (Napp, 2007)
 Aglaoschema mimos (Napp, 2008)
 Aglaoschema mourei (Napp, 1993)
 Aglaoschema potiguassu (Napp, 2008)
 Aglaoschema prasinipenne (Lucas, 1857)
 Aglaoschema prasiniventre (Gounelle, 1911)
 Aglaoschema quieci (Dalens, Tavakilian, & Touroult, 2010)
 Aglaoschema rondoniense (Napp, 2008)
 Aglaoschema ruficeps (Bates, 1870)
 Aglaoschema rufiventre (Germar, 1824)
 Aglaoschema tarnieri (Bates, 1870)
 Aglaoschema ventrale (Germar, 1824)
 Aglaoschema vinolenta (Dalens, Tavakilian, & Touroult, 2010)
 Aglaoschema violaceipenne (Aurivillius, 1897)
 Aglaoschema viridipenne (Thomson, 1860)

References

 
Compsocerini